Cokie the Clown is an EP by NOFX released on November 24, 2009 through Fat Wreck Chords. The EP was released as a single 5-song CD, and two separate 7" vinyl records dubbed Cokie the Clown and My Orphan Year. The tracks on this release were written and recorded during the Coaster sessions. The song "Co-Dependence Day" was previously released on the Warped Tour 2009 Tour Compilation. The album peaked at number 39 on the Billboard Independent Albums.

Track listings
Cokie the Clown CD
 "Cokie the Clown" – 2:26
 "Straight Outta Massachusetts" – 1:16
 "Fermented and Flailing" – 2:40
 "Co-Dependence Day" – 1:28
 "My Orphan Year" (acoustic) – 2:58

''Cokie the Clown 7" "Cokie the Clown" – 2:26
 "Co-Dependence Day" – 1:28
 "Straight Outta Massachusetts" – 1:16My Orphan Year'' 7"
 "My Orphan Year" (acoustic) – 2:58
 "Fermented and Flailing" – 2:40

Personnel
NOFX
Fat Mike – vocals, bass, acoustic guitar
Eric Melvin – guitar, vocals
El Hefe – guitar, vocals
Erik Sandin – drums

References

External links

Cokie the Clown at YouTube (streamed copy where licensed)

NOFX EPs
2009 EPs
Fat Wreck Chords EPs